Karuppu Sami (Tamil: கருப்பசாமி, IAST: Karuppasāmi)  is one of the regional Tamil male deities popular among the rural social groups of Tamil Nadu and parts of Kerala. He is one of the 21 associated folk-deities of Ayyanar, and is hence was one among the demigods or kaval deivams in the Dravidian folk religion. He is sometimes considered to be a form of Shiva among Shaivas.

Temples and shrines
Karuppu Sami temple is mostly found in the outskirts of the Village. Usually, the whole village contributes to the maintenance of the temple. These temples/shrines do not have traditional Gopurams and have large statues of Gods with large eyes, holding weapons like bow and arrow, swords, sickle and other weapons. There could also be statues of 7 Kannimar goddesses/Saptha Kanniyar (7 virgins) and animals, often a hunting dog, a lion and horse alongside the main idol of Karuppu Sami.

Karuppu Sami worship is based on an ancient ancestral clan-based worship system, which has barely syncretised with Hindu tradition. For instance, most officiating priests are non-Brahmins, and derive from local lineages that had initiated the cult generations ago. The worship pattern is non-Vedic or non-Agamic through folk tales, songs and arts (Villu pattu, karakattam, koothu etc.). The local priest might offer flowers or vibhuti (holy ash) to the worshippers and may play the role of an oracle for Shamanism. Various persons within the clan system are identified to play to the role of oracle on annual turn basis. They undertake vradham and maintain chastity and purity during the period. During the festivals, oracles get into trance state (Sami adudhal) and deliver counselling messages to the group assembled there without bias. Before the oracles deliver counselling messages, oracles stand on top of the aruval (aruval mel vakku). The normal problems addressed are family problems, financial troubles and local community and social issues for resolving within the community group with the agreement of local ancestral god through oracle. Whenever the wishes of the people are granted, they give their offerings to him based on what they vowed to offer.

Karuppu Sami is also worshipped in Trinidad and Tobago, Guyana, Suriname, Guadeloupe, and Martinique under the name Dee Baba, Sangili Karuppan, or Sangani Baba.

Annual festivals
The village committee would decide on when the annual festival be conducted. The time of the year when this would fall varies with villages and their local customs - each of which will be associated a folk-lore. Generally, the mass convention assembly of a large number of related family members is organized during the spring season for a period of 2 to 3 days. The commencement of the festival will be with that of a hoisting of the flag and tying the "Kaappu". After this time, villagers cannot go out of the village but can come in from a different village.

See also
 Ayyanar
 Isakki
 Madurai Veeran
 Muneeswarar
 Sudalai Maadan

References

Tamil deities
Regional Hindu gods
Hindu folk deities